Vicious Fun is a 2020 Canadian comedy horror film directed by Cody Calahan and starring Evan Marsh, Ari Millen, Amber Goldfarb, Julian Richings,  Robert Maillet and David Koechner.

Plot
In 1983 Minnesota, serial killer Phil targets Carrie outside a motel. Carrie surprises Phil by suddenly stabbing him in his throat once he locks her inside his car. Joel, a film critic for the horror magazine Vicious Fanatics, interviews B-movie director Jack Portwood. Joel tells Jack his idea for a film about a serial killing taxicab driver. At home, Joel sees his roommate Sarah, who he has an unrequited crush on, being dropped off by her new boyfriend Bob. Jealous of Bob and anxious for insight into Sarah, Joel follows Bob to a Chinese restaurant where they engage in conversation at the bar. Unaware of Joel’s true identity, Bob speaks disparagingly about Sarah’s pitiable roommate before sticking Joel with their tab and leaving with another woman.

Joel continues getting drunk, stumbles into a supply closet, and passes out. The restaurant locks up for the night. When he recovers, Joel wanders back into the dining room where Zachary leads a 12-step meeting for Carrie, Fritz, Mike, and Hideo. The group mistakes Joel for Phil. Sensing danger if they realize he isn’t supposed to be there, Joel plays along. Joel gradually realizes he is stuck in a self-help meeting for serial killers. Joel uses his movie idea about a killer cab driver in an attempt to blend in. Joel discovers Bob is also a serial killer when Bob returns for the meeting. Bob pokes holes in Joel’s killer cab driver claims until everyone realizes Joel isn’t Phil.

The killers argue over how to handle their interloper. When Zachary asserts too much authority, Mike, Bob, and Fritz kill him. Carrie uses the opportunity to lock herself and Joel inside the kitchen. Carrie reveals she belongs to a secret organization and is on a mission to assassinate serial killers. Fritz tries getting inside the kitchen through an exterior door, but Carrie cuts off his fingers. Hideo sneaks into the kitchen through an overhead vent, but Joel plays possum so Carrie can sneak up from behind and strangle Hideo with Phil’s intestines. Bob finds Joel’s driver’s license and discovers he is Sarah’s roommate. Bob taunts Joel by threatening to kill Sarah. Joel tells Carrie about his crush and how he followed Bob to learn more about his relationship with Sarah. Carrie points out that Joel should reexamine his own stalker-like behavior. Without consulting Carrie, Joel pulls the fire alarm. Carrie warns Joel that the cops won’t save them like he thinks they will. Bob calls 911 to frame Carrie as a dangerous threat. Bob, Mike, and Fritz then flee the scene. The police arrive and arrest Carrie and Joel upon finding the dead bodies.

Officer Tony and detectives Doyle and Hollands take Carrie and Joel to the police station for questioning. Joel tries explaining what happened, but the detectives dismiss his seemingly crazy claims. Joel also tries calling Sarah to warn her about Bob, but she simply says she is coming to get Joel before hanging up. Even though Carrie warns that Bob and the other killers will come to the station to murder everyone, the disbelieving detectives lock Carrie and Joel in a cell. Bob poses as a special agent to infiltrate the police station. Bob’s ruse gives him access to a notebook confiscated from Carrie. Carrie’s kill list reveals what she has been doing. Fritz kills Officer Tony. Mike and Bob kill the two detectives. Using a stolen paper clip, Carrie unlocks the cells holding her and Joel. Carrie kills Mike and Fritz.

Sarah is shocked at the bloody scene when she arrives at the station. Bob stabs Carrie from behind. Joel gets stabbed in his arm when he steps in to shield Carrie. After knocking Bob to the floor, Joel helps Carrie limp outside to Sarah’s car. Sarah smacks into Bob while speeding away to the hospital. Bob poses as a doctor to infiltrate the hospital where Carrie and Joel are being treated. Joel helps Carrie fight Bob. Carrie stabs Bob to death with a scalpel. Having changed her mind about Joel’s ineffectual uselessness, Carrie considers taking him on as an apprentice. Joel nods goodbye to Sarah as he and Carrie sneak out of the hospital. Some time later, Carrie and Joel take down a serial killer hiding out at a movie theater showing a Jack Portwood film based on the killer cab driver idea Jack stole from Joel.

Cast
 Evan Marsh as Joel
 Amber Goldfarb as Carrie
 Ari Millen as Bob
 Julian Richings as Fritz
 Sean Baek as Hideo
 Robert Maillet as Mike
 David Koechner as Zachary
 Alexa Rose Steele as Sarah
 Kristopher Bowman as Detective Doyle
 Mark Gibson as Detective Hollands
 John Fray as Officer Tony
 Joe Bostick as Phil
 Gord Rand as Jack Portwood

Reception 
The film has  rating on the review aggregator website Rotten Tomatoes, based on  critic reviews. The website's consensus reads, "A fiendishly goofy premise, strong performances, and a strong dose of winkingly meta humor help Vicious Fun deliver on its title."

Natalia Keogan of Paste gave the film a 7.4 rating, saying, "Vicious Fun will delight any horror fan with a cursory knowledge of the genre." The Guardians Leslie Felperin gave the film 3/5 stars. However, Simon Abrams of RogerEbert.com gave the film 1 star and called the film "corny" and criticized its "latent sexism."

References

External links 
 
 

2020 films
2020 comedy horror films
Canadian comedy horror films
English-language Canadian films
2020s English-language films
2020s Canadian films